Partner relationship management (PRM), used especially in IT industries, is a system of methodologies, strategies, software, and web-based capabilities which help a vendor to manage partner relationships. The general purpose of PRM is to enable vendors to better manage their partners through the introduction of reliable systems, processes and procedures for interacting with them. Web-based PRM systems typically include a content Management System, a partner and customer contact database, and the notion of a partner portal which allows partners to log in and interact with a vendor's sales opportunity database and obtain product, pricing, and training information. This helps vendors to streamline processes, as well as to collect and assess data about various stages of the partner sales funnel. There are a number of solution providers who offer PRM software to companies who rely heavily on a PRM solution to stay relevant in their respective industries.

Vendors who implement a PRM solution are typically motivated by a need to reduce the financial overhead, automate regular processes, and establish new partnerships to drive channel revenue and scale. Partners may also be integrators or managed service providers. Unlike customer relationship management systems, which are tailored toward getting an end customer to purchase from you, a PRM system is focused on getting a partner to sell on your behalf. As a result, they commonly offer web-based self-service tools, information, and resources to partner resellers. Tools often include:
 Market development funds Request Programs
 Training, Certification, and Accreditation Automation
 Deal Registration Programs, under which vendors register the partner who has brought them a potential deal with a qualified prospect as their intended or preferred channel for a subsequent sale 
 Indirect Sales Pipeline Reporting
 Joint Business Planning
 Reward and Loyalty Programs
 Content Library

Trends
Gartner reports that PRM solutions have mainly been adopted by companies in the hardware technology, software technology, telecommunication, and manufacturing industries.

The PRM application market has expanded significantly in the last 10 years, with vendors offering improved end-to-end and point solutions for the management of channel sales partners.

Forrester reports, “[t]he PRM market is growing because more executive teams, as well as channel, marketing, and sales professionals, are recognizing the impact of third-party influencers in getting to new buyers. They are placing trust in PRM providers to act as strategic partners, allowing them to broaden their reach and influence the partner journey in new ways.” Forrester identified the 12 most significant PRM providers as: Salesforce, Magentrix, Allbound, Channeltivity, Mindmatrix, ChannelXperts, Impartner, Oracle, TIE Kinetix, Webinfinity, Zift Solutions, and ZINFI.

See also 
 Customer relationship management
 Supplier relationship management
 Facility management
 Software as a service

References 

Partnerships
Supply chain management
Business software